Pavan Malhotra (born 2 July 1958) is an Indian actor who works in Hindi films and television alongside Punjabi and few Telugu  films. He has played lead roles in Buddhadeb Dasgupta's National Film Award-winning Bagh Bahadur and Saeed Akhtar Mirza's Salim Langde Pe Mat Ro, both released in 1989. He is famous for his role as the cold-blooded mafia don Irfan Khan in the Telugu blockbuster Aithe (2003) and in his acclaimed role of Tiger Memon in Black Friday (2004). In 2005, he acted in the Telugu movie Anukokunda Oka Roju as a Tantrik.

Early life and career
Born in Delhi into a Punjabi Hindu Khatri family, Malhotra grew up in Nawabganj, Old Delhi, and studied at HAPPY School. Having graduated in arts from Hansraj College, Delhi University. His first hand experience in movies was as an assistant in costume department of Gandhi (film). Thereafter he was production assistant in Jaane Bhi Do Yaaro, Khamosh and Mohan Joshi Hazir Ho!. Pavan ventured into the Delhi theatre circuit, thereafter he moved to Mumbai, where he started with the television industry as an assistant on the sets of the TV series, Yeh Jo Hai Zindagi (1984), before he got a role in Saeed Akhtar Mirza's TV series on Doordarshan, Nukkad  (1986), which got him noticed. Meanwhile, he had entered the film industry and made his debut with Pankaj Parashar's Ab Ayega Mazaa (1984).

Over the years he had worked with directors like Buddhadeb Dasgupta, Saeed Akhtar Mirza, Shyam Benegal, Deepa Mehta and Roland Joffé.

In 2006, he was seen in Manish Goswami's Aisa Desh Hai Mera on Sony television. He is seen on the TV series Alag Alag and Partho Mitra's Patang on DD Metro. He recently starred in the major hit movies Jab We Met and Bhaag Milkha Bhaag. He is currently acting in Lagi Tujhse Lagan as Malmal More on Colors TV. He has recently worked in hit movies like Punjab 1984 and Children Of War.

In 2016, a retrospective to mark his 25 years in cinema was held at India International Centre (IIC), Delhi.

In the Latest Hindi Web Series Grahan (TV Series) on Disney+ Hotstar, he played a Character of Rishi Ranjan/ Gursewak Singh father of Amrita Singh (Zoya Hussain) which is released on 24 June 2021, based on the Satya Vyas Novel 'Chaurasi'

Filmography

Films

 Ab Ayega Mazaa (1984)
 Khamosh (1985)
 Bagh Bahadur (1989) – Ghunuram
 Salim Langde Pe Mat Ro (1989) – Salim, the Lame
 Sau Crore (1991)
 Antarnaad (1991)
 City of Joy (1992) – Ashish
 Tarpan  (1994) – Dhannu
 Brothers in Trouble (1995) – Amir
 Pardes (1997) – Sharafat Ali
 Earth (1998) – The Butcher
 Fakir  (1998)
 The Perfect Husband (2003)
 Aithe (Telugu film) (2003) – Irfan Khan
 Aithe Enti (Telugu film) (2004)
 Black Friday (2004) – Tiger Memon
 Anukokunda Oka Roju (Telugu film)  (2005)
 Eashwar Mime Co. (2005)
 Andhrudu (Telugu film) (2005) - Ranaveer Sinha
 Amma Cheppindi (Telugu film) (2006) - Bose's Father
 Don - The Chase Begins again (2006) – Narang
 Blood Brothers (2007) – Coach
 Jab We Met (2007) – Geet's Uncle
 50 Lakh (2007) – Irfan Khan
 My Name Is Anthony Gonsalves (2008) – Sikandar
 De Taali (2008)
 Maan Gaye Mughal-e-Azam (2008) - Qayyum Cable- Maut Ka Lable
 Delhi-6 (2009) – Jaigopal
 Ek Tho Chance (2009)
 Road to Sangam (2009)
 Badmaash Company (2010) – Jazz
 Ek Nayi Chhoti Si Zindagi (2011) – Shyam
 Bhindi Bazaar (2011) – Mamu
 Yeh Faasley (2011) – Digvijay Singh (Diggy)
 Shaitan (2011) – Police Commissioner
Ek Thi Daayan (2013) – Mr. Mathur (Bobo's Dad)
Bhaag Milkha Bhaag (2013) – Coach Gurudev Singh
Punjab 1984 (2014) – Deep Singh Rana
Children of War (2014)
Bang Bang (2014 film) (2014) – Zorawar
Eh Janam Tumhare Lekhe (2015)
Zorawar (2016) – Tejpal Singh
Rustom (2016) – Inspector Vincent Lobo
Missing on a Weekend(2016) - Inspector Ali Ansari
Super Singh (2017) - Saint Rehmat 
Mubarakan(2017) - Charan's Father (Baldev Singh Bajwa)
Judwaa 2 (2017) - Officer Dhillon
Setters (2019)
 Family of Thakurganj (2019)
 Abhi Toh Party Shuru Hui Hai (2019) 
 Ek Sandhu Hunda Si Punjabi (2020)

 Flight (2021)

Television
 Nukkad (1986) – Hari
 Zameen Aasmaan (1995)
 Aahat (1997-1999)
 XZone (1998)
 CID (1999-2007) 
 Circus (1989)
9 Malabar Hill (1997)
Khamoshiyaan... Kab Tak(2001)
Karishma – The Miracles of Destiny (2003 - 2004)
Mrityudand
Kahan Se Kahan Tak
Laagi Tujhse Lagan (2009)
Khidki (2016) Sab TV
Grahan  (2021) Hotstar
Tabbar (2021) SonyLIV

Awards

 National Award – Fakir (Hindi) – 1998
 Nandi Special Jury Award – Aithe (Telugu) – 2003
 Filmfare Best Villain Award (Telugu) - Aithe – 2003
 2022 Filmfare OTT Awards - Tabbar 2022 (Best Actor in Drama Series)

References

External links
 

1958 births
Living people
Male actors from Delhi
Delhi University alumni
Indian male film actors
Indian male stage actors
Male actors in Hindi cinema
Male actors in Bengali cinema
Indian male television actors
20th-century Indian male actors
21st-century Indian male actors
Filmfare Awards South winners
Male actors in Telugu cinema